Minnesota City is a city in Winona County, Minnesota, United States.  The population was 202 at the 2020 census.

History
Minnesota City was platted in 1852. The city took its name from the Minnesota Territory. A post office has been in operation in Minnesota City since 1852.

Geography

Demographics

2010 census
As of the census of 2010, there were 204 people, 81 households, and 60 families living in the city. The racial makeup of the city was 99.5% White and 0.5% Native American. Hispanic or Latino of any race were 0.5% of the population.

There were 81 households, of which 39.5% had children under the age of 18 living with them, 54.3% were married couples living together, 9.9% had a female householder with no husband present, 9.9% had a male householder with no wife present, and 25.9% were non-families. 16.0% of all households were made up of individuals, and 2.4% had someone living alone who was 65 years of age or older. The average household size was 2.52 and the average family size was 2.77.

The median age in the city was 36 years. 25.5% of residents were under the age of 18; 6.8% were between the ages of 18 and 24; 29% were from 25 to 44; 26.4% were from 45 to 64; and 12.3% were 65 years of age or older. The gender makeup of the city was 52.9% male and 47.1% female.

2000 census
As of the census of 2000, there were 235 people, 84 households, and 64 families living in the city. The racial makeup of the city was 99.57% White, 0.43% from other races. Hispanic or Latino of any race were 0.43% of the population.

There were 84 households, out of which 34.5% had children under the age of 18 living with them, 65.5% were married couples living together, 7.1% had a female householder with no husband present, and 23.8% were non-families. 16.7% of all households were made up of individuals, and 4.8% had someone living alone who was 65 years of age or older.  The average household size was 2.80 and the average family size was 3.05.

In the city, the population was spread out, with 27.7% under the age of 18, 7.7% from 18 to 24, 29.8% from 25 to 44, 25.1% from 45 to 64, and 9.8% who were 65 years of age or older.  The median age was 35 years. For every 100 females, there were 113.6 males.  For every 100 females age 18 and over, there were 104.8 males.

The median income for a household in the city was $46,458, and the median income for a family was $47,708. Males had a median income of $30,000 versus $22,500 for females. The per capita income for the city was $18,430.  None of the families and 2.5% of the population were living below the poverty line, including no under eighteens and 10.0% of those over 64.

References

External links
Official site

Cities in Minnesota
Minnesota populated places on the Mississippi River
Cities in Winona County, Minnesota
1852 establishments in Minnesota Territory